Adami may refer to:

Adami (surname)
Adami, a town in the Bible (or Adami-nekeb)
Adami (car), Italian automobile manufacture

See also
Winn Adami, the duplicitous Bajoran woman who became Kai in the science fiction television series Star Trek: Deep Space Nine